Morphotactics represent the ordering restrictions in place on the ordering of morphemes. Etymologically, it can be translated as "the set of rules that define how morphemes (morpho) can touch (tactics) each other".

Example of a morphotactic rule
Many English affixes may only be attached directly to morphemes with particular parts of speech:
 do + -able + -ity = doability
but not
 do + -ity + -able = *doityable
The suffix -ity produces a noun from an adjective, and -able creates adjectives from verbs. To reverse the order violates the rules of English morphotactics, making the word ungrammatical (marked with an asterisk).

Common morphotactic model

Finite-state machine and Graph are the two models which are often used as a set of rules for morphotactics.

References
 Morphology and Computation, By Richard William Sproat. MIT Press: 1992, p. 83. 
 Finite-state non-concatenative morphotactics By Kenneth R. Beesley and Lauri Karttunen 2000. In Proceedings of the 38th Annual Meeting on Association for Computational Linguistics (ACL '00). Association for Computational Linguistics

Notes

 
Grammar